Steam Engine Company No. 20 may refer to:

Steam Engine Company No. 20 (1735 Bardstown Road), Louisville, Kentucky, listed on the National Register of Historic Places in Jefferson County, Kentucky, one of 18 Historic Firehouses of Louisville
Steam Engine Company No. 20 (1330 Bardstown Road), Louisville, Kentucky, listed on the National Register of Historic Places in Jefferson County, Kentucky, one of 18 Historic Firehouses of Louisville